This is a list of listed buildings in Frederikssund Municipality, Denmark.

List

3600 Frederikssund

3630 Jægerspris

4050 Skibby

See also
 List of churches in Frederikssund Municipality

References

External links

 Danish Agency of Culture

 
Frederikssund